The Teresa Teng Memorial Hall was a memorial hall in Gushan District, Kaohsiung, Taiwan dedicated to singer Teresa Teng.

History
The memorial hall was opened in April 2010.

Architecture
The memorial hall building was located within the warehouse area along the Love River with a total area of 825 m2 equipped with a souvenir shop.

Exhibitions
The memorial hall displayed many of her personal belongings, such as car, jewellery, mahjong table etc.

See also
 List of tourist attractions in Taiwan

References

2010 establishments in Taiwan
Former buildings and structures in Taiwan
History of Kaohsiung